The Hålogaland Court of Appeal is one of six courts of appeal in the Kingdom of Norway. The Court is located in the city of Tromsø. The court has jurisdiction over the counties of Nordland, Troms, and Finnmark as well as the island territories of Jan Mayen and Svalbard. These areas constitute the judicial district of Hålogaland, which has nearly a half a million residents. This court can rule on both civil and criminal cases that are appealed from one of its subordinate district courts. Court decisions can be, to a limited extent, appealed to the Supreme Court of Norway. The court has 16 full-time judges plus a number of other support staff members (as of 2015). The chief judicial officer of the court is currently Monica Hansen Nylund. The court is administered by the Norwegian National Courts Administration.

Because of the great distances both at land and at sea in Northern Norway, the Court deals with many cases related to fishery and land rights. Northern Norway is also where the "three peoples" meet (Norwegians, Samis, and Kvens). The cultural variations demand bigger efforts of the Court's judges, among other the ability to understand different ways of living and thinking. Also lingual variations represent a challenge.

Location
The Court has its seat in Tromsø, the capital of Troms county and the largest city in Northern Norway (Hålogaland). Additionally, the Court permanently sits in the towns of Bodø (the capital of Nordland county and the second largest city in Northern Norway) and Mosjøen (also in Nordland county).  The Court may also sit in other places within its jurisdiction as needed.

Jurisdiction
This court accepts appeals from all of the district courts from its geographic jurisdiction. This court is divided into judicial regions and there is one or more district courts that belongs to each of these regions.

History
During the Middle Ages, the old Thing of Hålogaland met at Steigen in Nordland county. This assembly was dissolved in 1797 and after that time, Hålogaland was part of the diocesan court in Trondheim. On 1 January 1890, the Hålogaland District Court was established with its main court in the city of Tromsø.

References

External links 
 Hålogaland Court of Appeals 

Courts of appeal of Norway
1890 establishments in Norway
Organisations based in Tromsø
Courts and tribunals established in 1890